Jag kommer hem igen till jul is a 2002 Peter Jöback Christmas album, consisting of both classic and modern Christmas songs. On the album charts, it topped in Sweden by late 2002. In late 2003, it reentered the charts including a new single, "Gå inte förbi", a duet with Norwegian singer Sissel Kyrkjebø. The album also peaked number four on the Norwegian Albums Chart.

Track listing
Intro, Här är vi med julens kransar (Deck the Hall with Boughs of Holly)
Viskar en bön
Ave Maria
Jag kommer hem igen till jul
Jul, jul, strålande jul
Gläns över sjö och strand
Snön föll
Decembernatt (Halleluja)
Guds frid i gode vise män (God Rest Ye Merry, Gentlemen)
Marias sång
O helga natt (Cantique de noël)
Jag tror på dig
Stilla natt (Stille Nacht, heilige Nacht)
Varmt igen

Contributors
Peter Jöback - vocals
Lars Halapi - guitar, vibraphone, glockenspiel, omnichord
Peter Korhonen - drums
Robert Qwarforth - piano
Thomas Axelsson - bass

Charts

References 

Peter Jöback albums
2002 Christmas albums
Christmas albums by Swedish artists
Schlager Christmas albums
Sony Music Christmas albums
Swedish-language albums